is a 1967 Japanese film directed by Mio Ezaki. Inspired by Yujiro Ishihara's mega hit song of the same title

Plot
Sagara Toru proposed to his girlfriend Kitazawa Akiko. She was intended to accept it but she was in a traffic accident on the way to the promised place. Sagara waited her for a long time　without knowing it and considered his proposal was rejected. Four years later, Akiko suddenly appears in front of Sagara. She asks him to leave her new boyfriend Kuen secretly from Japan.

Cast
 Yūjirō Ishihara : Sagara Toru
 Ruriko Asaoka : Kitazawa Akiko
 Hideaki Nitani : Kuen
 Meiko KajiMasako Ohta : Hiromi
 Asao Sano : Detective Miyatake
 Kaku Takashina : Senkichi
 Mizuho Suzuki : Chan
 Hei Enoki : Nishi
 Eiji Gō : Bill

References

External links
 A Warm Misty Night at Nikkatsu

Nikkatsu films
Japanese crime films
1960s Japanese films